Rtu or RTU may refer to: 

In education:
Rajasthan Technical University, in Rajasthan, India
Riga Technical University, in Riga, Latvia
Rizal Technological University, in the Philippines
RTU MIREA, Russian Technological University, Moscow

In other uses:
Ṛtú, a Sanskrit word referring to a fixed or appointed time
Ready to use (Ready-To-Use), used in Medicine, e.g. RTU Suspension for Injection
Real Tamale United, a football club based in Tamale, Ghana
Recognizable Taxonomic Unit, used in Parataxonomy
Remote terminal unit, a microprocessor controlled electronic device
Returned to unit, a British and Canadian military term
Road to Ultra, music festival
Roof Top Unit, a commercial air handling unit that heats and cools air
Chilevisión, formerly known as Red de Televisión de la Universidad de Chile